Etienne Shew-Atjon (born 24 November 1974) is a Dutch former professional footballer and current video analyst for Feyenoord. During his eleven years with Utrecht, they won the KNVB Cup, twice.

Career

Early career
Shew-Atjon joined the Feyenoord academy on an early age, but instead of being promoted for the first squad, he was released in early 1996. He then joined amateur club VV Rozenburg, where he played in the Hoofdklasse for two years. He impressed there, and was offered a contract by Eredivisie club FC Utrecht in 1998. He made his debut in professional football on 23 August 1998, in a 2–4 away win over NAC Breda. Shew-Atjon started in the starting line-up, but was replaced at half-time for Emmanuel Nwakire.

Professional career
Partly due to injuries, Shew-Atjon never grew into a permanent starter for Utrecht, but nevertheless remained continuously connected to the club. At the end of the 2007–08 season, in which he made only two league appearances due to an achilles tendon injury, his expiring contract did initially not seem to be extended, because he did not feature in the plans of head coach Willem van Hanegem. After defender Erik Pieters moved to PSV Eindhoven in the summer break prior to the 2008–09 season, Shew-Atjon was nevertheless offered a one-year contract extension. However, the club continued to look for a permanent replacement for Pieters, and eventually found this in Romanian Mihai Neșu. Shew-Atjon indicated that she was very pleased with the contract, and said "Especially because the club previously indicated that it did not want to continue with me, this is a nice gift. The fact that after my active football career I will continue to work as a scout for FC Utrecht has really been a wish of mine."

The one-year contract was since not renewed, and in the spring of 2009, Shew-Atjon joined FC Dordrecht in the second-tier Eerste Divisie. In the following season, he made 28 appearances for the club in the Eerste Divisie.

Post-retirement
After his season at Dordrecht, Shew-Atjon retired from professional football, and played a season with RVVH from Ridderkerk and then for two years with VV Smitshoek which he combined with a job as scout for Utrecht.

Shew-Atjon has been working at the Feyenoord Academy since July 2013; initially as a U15 coach, and from the summer of 2016 as a video and performance analyst for the youth department. In 2020, he was promoted to the main video analyst for Feyenoord and is part of the first-team staff.

Honours
Utrecht
KNVB Cup: 2002–03, 2003–04
Johan Cruyff Shield: 2004

References

External links

1974 births
Living people
Dutch footballers
FC Utrecht players
FC Dordrecht players
Eredivisie players
Eerste Divisie players
Footballers from Rotterdam
Dutch sportspeople of Surinamese descent
Dutch people of Chinese descent
Hakka sportspeople
Sportspeople of Chinese descent
Association football fullbacks
Feyenoord players
Feyenoord non-playing staff
RVVH players
VV Smitshoek players
FC Utrecht non-playing staff